USS Dennis J. Buckley (DE-553) was a proposed World War II United States Navy John C. Butler-class destroyer escort that was never completed.

Plans called for Dennis J. Buckley to be built at the Boston Navy Yard at Boston, Massachusetts. Her construction contract was cancelled on 10 June 1944 before she could be launched.

The name Dennis J. Buckley was reassigned to the destroyer USS Dennis J. Buckley (DD-808).

References

Navsource Naval History: Photographic History of the U.S. Navy: Destroyer Escorts, Frigates, Littoral Warfare Vessels

John C. Butler-class destroyer escorts
Cancelled ships of the United States Navy